Diether is a German given name, composed of the elements diet "people" and her "army".

It is distinct from, but in Modern German has become homophonic with, the name Dieter, which is a short form of Dietrich, composed of the same prefix but the unrelated suffix rihhi "rich". 

People called Diether include:
Diether von Isenburg (d. 1482)
Diether von Roeder (d. 1918), eponymous of German destroyer Z17 Diether von Roeder
Diether Lukesch (1918–2004)
Diether Posser (1922–2010)
Diether Haenicke (1935–2009)
Diether Krebs (1947–2000)
Diether Ocampo (b. 1974)
 Diether Perez (b. 2001)
 Diether Ong (b. 2011

See also
Germanic name

Germanic given names